Red ball may refer to:

Arts, entertainment, and media

Fictitious cases
 Red ball, a current murder case on the FOX television series Gotham, in the Season 2 episode "Knock Knock"
 Red ball, an impending murder, in the science fiction film Minority Report (in which the names of future victims of premeditated homicides appear on red balls after being predicted by a trio of psychics)

Television
 "Red Ball", Law & Order, season 16, episode 1
 "The Red Ball", season 3, episode 3 of the American animated television series The Boondocks (the title refers to the game of kickball, which uses the same red rubber balls as dodgeball)

Video Games
 Red Ball, a series of browser games, first released in 2009
 Red Ball, the first game in the Red Ball series, released for the Adobe Flash Player in 2009

Law enforcement and military 
 Red ball, a term used by the US Air Force, typically on the flight line, to identify aircraft maintenance issues that could prevent an on-time launch of aircraft.  This is usually when aircrew are present, and thus given highest priority.
 Red ball or redball, jargon for a high-profile police case that draws media and political attention, often used in the book Homicide: A Year on the Killing Streets and the television shows based on it: Homicide: Life on the Street and The Wire.
 The Red Ball Express was a truck convoy system that supplied Allied forces in World War II.

Sports
 Red ball, any of the red set of object balls in the cue sport of blackball (a.k.a. British eightball pool)
 Red ball, the object ball that is neither player's cue ball in carom billiards 
See Glossary of cue sports terms for more information
 Red ball, a red cricket ball used in test matches; by extension, the test matches themselves (e.g. "the team's red-ball performance" 
Red ball, any of the rack of one-point object balls in the cue sport of snooker